Orlovka is a city in Kemin District of Chüy Region. Its population was 6,167 in 2021. It is the center of Orlovka municipal council that also includes Podgornoye village. Orlovka was established in 1910. It became a city in 2012.

Population

Ski Resort

The village is well known for its ski resort thanks especially to its relative proximity to Bishkek (approx. 100 km), its night skiing facility as well as its regular treatment with snow groomers and snow cannons.

The resort has three primary ski slopes: red (800m + 400m long), blue (1200m) and green (200m). Two consecutive chairlifts and one ski tow operate there. The maximum height difference is around 300m.

References

External links
 Official website of the ski resort
 Ski resorts in Kyrgyzstan
 Snow and ski reports for Kyrgyzstan

Populated places in Chüy Region
Ski areas and resorts in Kyrgyzstan